Tüdeviin Myagmarjav (born 5 February 1945) is a Mongolian former sports shooter. He competed at the 1964, 1968, 1972 and 1976 Summer Olympics. He also competed at the 1974 Asian Games and won a bronze medal.

References

External links
 

1945 births
Living people
Mongolian male sport shooters
Olympic shooters of Mongolia
Shooters at the 1964 Summer Olympics
Shooters at the 1968 Summer Olympics
Shooters at the 1972 Summer Olympics
Shooters at the 1976 Summer Olympics
People from Govi-Altai Province
Asian Games medalists in shooting
Shooters at the 1974 Asian Games
Asian Games bronze medalists for Mongolia
Medalists at the 1974 Asian Games
20th-century Mongolian people